The  Lisbon Navigators is an American football team based in Lisbon, Portugal. Founded in April 2007, the Navigators compete in the Liga Portuguesa de Futebol Americano.

History
The Lisbon Navigators are the third Portuguese-American Football team, established two years after the Porto Renegades and the Crusaders American Football Team (2005). 

The Lisbon Navigators first played as a visiting team in the Liga Nacional de Fútbol Americano (LNFA) and joined the newly formed Liga Portuguesa de Futebol Americano (LPFA) the subsequent year. In its first season, the Navigators beat the Paredes Lumberjacks in the first Portuguese American Football Cup, becoming the first American Football champions of Portugal. 
 
In their second season, the Navigators earned another LNFA title by defeating the Lumberjacks, 37-27 in the second Portuguese American Football Cup (2011). The Navigators won again in the third Portuguese American Football Cup, beating the Maximinos Warriors, 26-7.

During the 2013 – 2015 seasons, the Navigators continued dominating the field, defeating the Porto Mutts by 20-12 in 2013 and winning the next two Portuguese American Football Cups in 2014 and 2015. The Navigators have been compared to the Budapest Wolves of Hungary, the Bucharest Warriors of Romania, the Bratislava Monarchs of Slovakia, and the Ljubljana Silverhawks of Slovenia.

Roster

Season Stats

Portuguese American Football Cup Finals Results

References

External links

American football teams in Europe
American football teams established in 2007
Sport in Lisbon
American football in Portugal
2007 establishments in Portugal